Wei County or Weixian is a county in the south of Hebei province, China, bordering Henan province to the south. It is under the administration of the prefecture-level city of Handan.

Administrative divisions

Weicheng, Dezheng, Huilong, Beiyao, Shuangjing, Yali, Chewang

Townships:
Damacun Township, Daxinzhuang Township, Damo Township, Dongdaigu Township, Beitaitou Township, Renwangji Township, Bianma Township, Shakouji Township, Jizhenzhai Township (棘针寨乡, Yehuguai Township, Yuanbao Township, Nanshuangmiao Township, Bokou Township, Zhang'erzhuang Township

Climate

References

External links

County-level divisions of Hebei
Handan